Talkheh Char (also Romanized as Talkheh Chār; also known as Talkh Chāh) is a village in Bezenjan Rural District, in the Central District of Baft County, Kerman Province, Iran. At the 2006 census, its population was 105, in 20 families.

References 

Populated places in Baft County